Abronia leurolepis is an arboreal alligator lizard that is endemic to Mexico. Its common name is smoothback arboreal alligator lizard.

References

Abronia
Endemic reptiles of Mexico
Reptiles described in 1993